The 	Bermuda Tournament was one of earliest known women's grass court tennis event's staged only one time in September 1876. It was held in Hamilton, Bermuda.

History
In 1924 Mary G. Gray gave an interview for American Lawn Tennis, then a book published by the United States Lawn Tennis Association in which she spoke of a tennis tournament she played in at Hamilton, Bermuda, the story was subsequently published under the chapter heading 'A Bermuda Tournament in 1876' On 15 September 1924. On 3 September 1876 a women's tennis tournament was held in Hamilton, Bermuda, that was won by Mary G. Gray who defeated Rose Key.

Earlier in 1876 in Ireland an All Ireland Lawn Tennis Championships,. organised by the Irish Champion Athletic Club, Dublin was also held between the 17th and 22th July that year. In 1879 the first  Bermuda Open Tennis Championships were held.

Result

See also
 1876 in Women's tennis
 All Ireland Lawn Tennis Championships
 Bermuda International Championships

References

Defunct sports competitions in Bermuda
Defunct tennis tournaments in Bermuda
Grass court tennis tournaments
Recurring sporting events established in 1876
Tennis tournaments in Bermuda